Grenville and Stratton was an electoral division of Cornwall in the United Kingdom which returned one member to sit on Cornwall Council between 2013 and 2021. It was abolished at the 2021 local elections, being succeeded by Stratton, Kilkhampton and Morwenstow and Poundstock.

Councillors

Extent
Grenville and Stratton represented the town of Stratton, the villages of Grimscott, Morwenstow and Kilkhampton, and the hamlets of Red Post, Hersham, Thurdon, Shop, Gooseham, West Youlstone, Woodford, Coombe, Stibb and Eastcott. The hamlet of Bush was shared with the Bude division. The division covered 9,825 hectares in total.

Election results

2017 election

2013 election

References

Electoral divisions of Cornwall Council